This article lists the colonial governors and administrators of British Cyprus.

Hitherto Ottoman Cyprus, a territory of the Ottoman Empire, a British protectorate under Ottoman suzerainty was established over Cyprus by the Cyprus Convention of 4 June 1878. The United Kingdom declared war on the Ottoman Empire on 5 November 1914 and annexed Cyprus. Turkey recognised British possession of Cyprus by the Treaty of Lausanne on 24 July 1923 and the island became a Crown Colony on 10 March 1925. Following the London and Zürich Agreements of 19 February 1959 Cyprus became an independent republic on 16 August 1960, and joined the Commonwealth of Nations in 1961.

List of high commissioners (1878–1925)

List of governors (1925–1960)

Deputy governors

 Sir George Evelyn Sinclair: 1955–1960

See also

 President of Cyprus
 Vilayet of the Archipelago

References

 World Statesmen – Cyprus

Cyprus and the Commonwealth of Nations
British Governors
 
Cyrpus
British Cyprus